Adamolekun is a Yoruba surname. Notable people with the surname include:

 Ladipo Adamolekun, public administration scholar
 Nathaniel Adamolekun, Jamaican footballer
 Olufolasade Adamolekun, Jamaican footballer
 Yemi Adamolekun, executive director of Enough is Enough

Yoruba-language surnames